Chris Wells may refer to:

Beanie Wells (born 1988), also known as Chris Wells, Arizona Cardinals football player
Chris Wells (ice hockey) (born 1975), former National Hockey League player
Chris Wells (politician), UK politician, leader of Thanet District Council
Chris Wells (curler), Welsh curler and coach
Chris Wells (tennis), British tennis player